__toc__

Australian Capital Territory

Results by division

Canberra

Fraser

Northern Territory

Results by division

Lingiari

Solomon

References

See also 

 2013 Australian federal election
 Results of the 2013 Australian federal election (House of Representatives)
 Post-election pendulum for the 2013 Australian federal election
 Members of the Australian House of Representatives, 2013–2016

Territories 2013